Thiomonas cuprina is an As(III)-oxidizing bacterium from the genus  Thiomonas. It is proposed to be reclassified, along with Thiomonas arsenivorans,  as strains of Thiomonas delicata.

References

Comamonadaceae
Bacteria described in 1997